= Petra Engineering Industries Company =

- Company type: Private
- Industry: Manufacturing
- Founded: 1987; 39 years ago
- Headquarters: Amman, Jordan
- Products: Air conditioning
- Website: petra-eng.com

Petra Engineering Industries Company is an industrial manufacturing company based in Jordan, that specializes in ventilating, heating and air-conditioning systems.

The company which was established in 1987, now exports to around 40 companies worldwide. The company managed to export its products to several locations in the United States, including NASA.
